WHOV is a non-commercial FM radio station licensed to Hampton, Virginia, serving Hampton Roads.  WHOV is owned and operated by Hampton University.  It airs urban contemporary, jazz and black gospel music.  Many shows are hosted by Hampton University students.

References

External links
 88.1 WHOV Online
 

1964 establishments in Virginia
Urban contemporary radio stations in the United States
Radio stations established in 1964
HOV
HOV
HOV